The Knoxville Incline was a broad gauge inclined railway that ran between Pittsburgh's South Side and Allentown neighborhoods. The charter was in planning as of January 1890, with a target filing date of February 8 of that year, and was originally to be called the Arlington Avenue Inclined Plane. The last day of service was December 3, 1960, and it was demolished before the year ended. It was designed by John H. McRoberts, with a length of 2644 feet. The Knoxville Incline briefly controlled the Pittsburgh, Knoxville & St. Clair Electric Railroad, while itself being later controlled by Pittsburgh Railways. During its operation, the incline ferried people and freight between the South Side and Knoxville. The Knoxville Incline and the nearby Mount Oliver Incline enabled the development of land in Allentown and surrounding communities on the hilltop. Like the Nunnery Hill Incline, the Knoxville Incline featured a curve, an unusual engineering feat for an incline.

Fatal accident
On October 7, 1953 a boy, Alan Schiller, hanging from a car was killed. While it is commonly reported that Pittsburgh inclines recorded no fatalities, this, along with an incident on the St. Clair Incline, provide the only blemishes on the safety record of inclines in Pittsburgh. None of the fatalities occurred with paying passengers who had not jumped from cars.

See also
 List of funicular railways
 List of inclines in Pittsburgh
 Mount Oliver Incline
 Pittsburgh, Knoxville & St. Clair Electric Railroad

References

Railway inclines in Pittsburgh
Defunct funicular railways in the United States
9 ft gauge railways in the United States
Railway lines opened in 1890
Railway lines closed in 1960
1890 establishments in Pennsylvania
1960 disestablishments in Pennsylvania